Lewis Shuey House is a historic home located near Swoope, Augusta County, Virginia. The house was built around 1795.  Also on the property are two contributing outbuildings.

It was listed on the National Register of Historic Places in 1983.

References

Houses on the National Register of Historic Places in Virginia
Houses completed in 1795
Houses in Augusta County, Virginia
National Register of Historic Places in Augusta County, Virginia
1795 establishments in Virginia